Thelymitra nervosa, commonly called the spotted sun orchid, is a species of orchid in the family Orchidaceae that is endemic to New Zealand. It has a single broad, channelled leaf and up to ten blue flowers with darker spots.

Description
The arms on the sides of the column have dense tufts of white hairs. The lobe on top of the anther is dark purple, curves forwards and has a yellow, horseshoe shaped top. Flowering occurs from October to February.

Taxonomy and naming
Thelymitra nervosa was first formally described in 1887 by William Colenso from a plant collected near Mount Ruapehu, and the description was published in 1888 in Transactions and Proceedings of the New Zealand Institute. The specific epithet (nervosa) is a Latin word meaning "sinewy". Colenso noted that the bracts, sepals and petals of this species are "much veined".

Distribution and habitat
The spotted sun orchid grows in sunny places in forest, scrub and grassland. It is found on the North, South, Stewart and Chatham Islands.

References

nervosa
Endemic orchids of New Zealand
Orchids of New Zealand
Plants described in 1887